Jamison Ross is an American jazz drummer and vocalist.  He is the winner of the 2012 Thelonious Monk International Jazz Drums Competition.  Ross released his debut album Jamison on Concord Jazz on June 23, 2015. His sophomore album, All For One, was released on January 26, 2018.

Career
A native of Jacksonville, Florida, Jamison sang and played drums at his grandfather's church. He studied music at Douglas Anderson High School and Florida State University where he earned a Bachelor of Arts in Jazz Studies. He attended the University of New Orleans where he earned a Master of Music.

His career began during high school after appearing in the 2007 documentary Chops. In 2009, he was invited to the Betty Carter Jazz Ahead Residency at the Kennedy Center in Washington, D.C. During this program he met singer Carmen Lundy, who invited him to join her band. He recorded with Lundy on her albums Changes and Soul to Soul.

On June 23, 2015 Concord Jazz released Ross's debut album, which was recorded at Esplanade Studios in New Orleans. The album includes a guest appearance by Jon Batiste, bandleader for the Late Show with Stephen Colbert. The album received a nomination for Best Jazz Vocal Album at the 58th Grammy Awards.

Awards and honors
 Won Thelonious Monk International Jazz Competition, drums, 2012
 Mentioned by Vanity Fair magazine
 Produced GRAMMY-nominated song "Let Me Go" by Mykal Kilgore

Discography

Filmography

References

External links 
Official website

American jazz drummers
American jazz singers
1987 births
Living people
21st-century American singers
Musicians from Jacksonville, Florida
21st-century American drummers
Snarky Puppy members
University of New Orleans alumni
Florida State University alumni